Meineckia stipularis is a species of plant in the family Phyllanthaceae. It is endemic to Tanzania, found in the Mangalisa forest in the Rubeho Mountains (part of the Eastern Arc Mountains).

References

Flora of Tanzania
stipularis
Vulnerable plants
Taxonomy articles created by Polbot